António Cândido Duarte Paris (born 13 June 1957) is a former Portuguese footballer who played as a defender.

External links 
 
 

1957 births
Living people
People from São Vicente, Cape Verde
Portuguese footballers
Portugal international footballers
Cape Verdean footballers
Portuguese people of Cape Verdean descent
Association football defenders
Primeira Liga players
G.D. Estoril Praia players
C.D. Nacional players
S.C. Braga players
S.C. Salgueiros players